Khrystyna Oleksandrivna Pohranychna (born 13 May 2003) is a Ukrainian individual rhythmic gymnast. She is the 2018 Youth Olympic Games all-around silver medalist, a 2020 Olympic Games all-around finalist, and a four-time medalist at the 2018 European Junior Championships. She is the 2017 and 2018 junior national all-around champion and the 2019 and 2021 national all-around silver medalist.

Early life 
Pohranychna was born in Lviv on 13 May 2003. Her mother is a surgeon and her father is a journalist. She has a sister named Olesya who is two years older than her and a younger sister Angela who was born in 2017. Olesya and Khrystyna began rhythmic gymnastics when Khrystyna was five years old at the Nika Sports Club in Lviv. Her inspiration is Ukrainian rhythmic gymnast and Olympic medalist Hanna Rizatdinova.

Junior career 

Pohranychna was added to the junior national team in 2016. She made her international debut at the 2016 Junior European Championships in Holon and placed sixth in the team competition alongside Olena Diachenko and Yeva Meleshchuk. She qualified for the rope final where she also finished sixth.

Pohranychna became the 2017 Ukrainian junior all-around champion, becoming the first gymnast from Lviv to win the Ukrainian Rhythmic Gymnastics Championships since Ukrainian independence.

At the 2018 European Championships in Guadalajara, Spain, Pohranychna, Viktoriia Onopriienko, and Anastasiya Voznyak won the team silver medal behind Russia. She won the silver medals in the ball and ribbon event finals, both behind Russia's Lala Kramarenko, and she won hoop bronze and placed fourth in clubs. She was then selected to represent Ukraine at the 2018 Summer Youth Olympics, and she won the silver medal in the individual all-around behind Russia's Daria Trubnikova.

Senior career

2019 
Pohranychna became age eligible for senior competition in 2019. She made her senior international debut at the Pesaro World Cup and placed fifth in the hoop final. Then at the Tashkent World Cup she placed fourth in the all-around and also qualified for all four event finals. In the event finals, she finished fourth in ball, sixth in hoop and clubs, and eighth in ribbon. She won her first World Cup medal at the Guadalajara World Challenge Cup with a silver in hoop behind Russia's Alexandra Soldatova. She then won the all-around silver medal behind Vlada Nikolchenko at the Ukrainian Championships. Then at the Cluj Napoca World Challenge Cup, she placed sixth in both hoop and clubs. At the World Championships in Baku, She finished fifth in the team competition alongside Vlada Nikolchenko and Yeva Meleshchuk. She then finished twelfth in the all-around final with a score of 80.575, earning Ukraine a second quota for the 2020 Olympic Games.

2020 
Pohranychna did not compete at the beginning of the season due to the COVID-19 pandemic. In September, she placed fifth in the ball, club, and ribbon and sixth in the all-around and hoop at the Deriugina Cup.

2021 

In March 2021, Pohranychna tested positive for COVID-19 and had to miss the Sofia World Cup. She returned to competition at the Tashkent World Cup and placed seventh in the clubs and ribbon event finals. At the Ukrainian Championships, she won the all-around silver medal by only 0.100 behind Viktoriia Onopriienko. She then finished fifteenth in the all-around at the Pesaro World Cup. She competed at her first senior European Championships in Varna, Bulgaria. She only competed on the ribbon, helping the Ukrainian team place fifth and qualifying for the ribbon final. In the ribbon final, she placed sixth with a score of 22.000. In July, she competed at the Minsk World Challenge Cup and won her second World Cup medal, a bronze in the ribbon, and also placed sixth in the all-around.

Pohranychna and Viktoriia Onopriienko were selected to represent Ukraine at the 2020 Summer Olympics in Tokyo. Pohranychna qualified for the individual all-around final in tenth place, ahead of Japan's Sumire Kita by 0.300. In the all-around final, she finished in ninth place ahead of Onopriienko with a total score of 95.100. After the Olympic Games, Pohranychna competed at the World Championships in Kitakyushu, Japan. In the ribbon final, she placed fourth with a score of 21.950 behind Alina Harnasko and Dina and Arina Averina. She also placed eighth in the hoop and clubs finals. She then competed in the all-around final and finished in eleventh place, and Ukraine placed fourth in the team competition.

2022 
Pohranychna had surgery on her knee at the beginning of the year.
She began volunteering as a medical assistant during the Russian invasion of Ukraine.

Awards 
Pohranychna was voted "Lvivian of the Year" by the citizens of Lviv in 2017.

Routine music

Detailed Olympic results

References

External links

 
 
 
 

2003 births
Living people
Ukrainian rhythmic gymnasts
Olympic gymnasts of Ukraine
Gymnasts at the 2018 Summer Youth Olympics
Gymnasts at the 2020 Summer Olympics
Sportspeople from Lviv
21st-century Ukrainian women